The 2007–08 OB I bajnokság season was the 71st season of the OB I bajnokság, the top level of ice hockey in Hungary. Seven teams participated in the league, and Alba Volan Szekesfehervar won the championship.

Regular season

Playoffs

Quarterfinals 
 HC Miercurea Ciuc - Miskolci Jegesmedvék JSE 2:0 (3:1, 5:1) 
 SC Miercurea Ciuc - Ferencvárosi TC 2:0 (7:3, 2:1) 
 Újpesti TE - Alba Volán Székesfehérvár 0:2 (1:2 OT, 1:5)

Semifinals
 SC Miercurea Ciuc - Alba Volán Székesfehérvár 0:3 (1:5, 2:3, 1:5)  
 Dunaújvárosi Acél Bikák - HC Miercurea Ciuc 1:3 (2:6, 3:2, 1:2 SO, 2:3 OT)

3rd place
 Dunaújvárosi Acél Bikák - SC Miercurea Ciuc 0:3 (1:4, 0:4, 1:5)

Final
 HC Miercurea Ciuc - Alba Volán Székesfehérvár 0:4 (3:5, 2:6, 1:9, 0:6)

External links
 Season on hockeyarchives.info

OB I bajnoksag seasons
Hun
OB